Heliura valdiviai is a moth of the subfamily Arctiinae. It was described by Juan Grados in 1999. It is found in Peru. It is named valdiviai in honor of the peruvian biologist Rubén Valdivia Villar.

References

Moths described in 1999
Arctiinae